Wojciech Jastrzębowski (19 April 1799 – 30 December 1882) was a Polish scientist, naturalist and inventor, professor of botany, physics, zoology and horticulture at Instytut Rolniczo-Leśny in Marymont in Warsaw, and insurgent of the November Uprising. He was one of the fathers of ergonomics.

Biography
Jastrzębowski was born in Szczepkowo-Giewarty, Janowo parish, near Mława, on 19 April 1799. He was a member of a Polish noble family that originated from the village of Janowiec-Jastrząbki in the Janowiec Kościelny on Pobożany parish, under the coat of arms of Pobóg. His father, Maciej Jastrzębowski, married Marianna Leśnikowska, heiress of part of Szczepkowo-Giewarty. Soon after the wedding he moved to his wife’s estate.

Jastrzębowski passed his maturity examination at the Warsaw Lyceum. He participated in the November Uprising. He was the creator of the sundial at Warsaw Lyceum as well as the creator of “Jastrzębowski Compass” – a device that allows sundials to be set in any place under any circumstances.

He was a pioneer of ergonomics.

Jastrzębowski became a member of the Warsaw Society of Friends of Learning, as well as a member of the Cracow Science Society, the Agricultural Society in Kielce and Lvov Agricultural Society. He was the honorary member of the Poznań Society of Friends of Learning.

He was the creator of Zakład Praktyki Leśnej, the first institution for the improvement of professional performance of woodsman and gamekeepers, in Feliksów near Brok. In 2004 a monument in Jastrzębowski's honour was erected in Brok.

Jastrzębowski married Aniela z d’Cherów and had five daughters and two sons. His grandson, also named Wojciech Jastrzębowski (1884-1963), was an artist, senator of the Second Polish Republic, and professor. Jastrzębowski died in Warsaw on 30 December 1882.

About the everlasting peace between the nations

During the battle at Olszynka Grochowska in defence of Warsaw in 1831, Wojciech Jastrzębowski formulated a document which may be described as a project of the first constitution of Europe united as one republic without internal borders, with unified judicial system and institutions consisting of representatives of all nations. The document was named ‘About the everlasting peace between the nations’ („O wiecznym pokoju między narodami”), and consisted of 77 articles. It was published on 3 May 1831 on the anniversary of the Constitution of 3 May 1791. In his text he suggested that all nations should renounce their freedom and become enslaved with the laws, all monarch should be henceforth the guardians and executors of these laws and should not be referred to with no other title than fathers of nations.

Commemorations
In Mazovian Voivodeship one may find a cycling path named after Jastrzębowski. It stretches from Ostrów Mazowiecka to Brok.

Selected writings
 Rys ergonomji czyli nauki o pracy, opartej na prawdach poczerpniętych z Nauki Przyrody (The Outline of Ergonomics, i.e. Science of Work, Based on the Truths Taken from the Natural Science) (1857). 
 Traktat o Wiecznym Przymierzu Miedzy Narodami Ucywilizowanymi - Konstytucja dla Europy (The Treatise on the Eternal Union between the Civilized Nations - the Constitution for Europe) (1831).

See also
 List of biologists
 Ergonomics

External links
 Ergonomia-polska.com
 Website of Akademia Rolnicza in Szczecin devoted to ergonomy
 Personal description of Wojciech Jastrzębowski
 Image of Olszynka Grochowska
 Personal description of W. B. Jastrzębowski

1799 births
1882 deaths
19th-century Polish inventors
November Uprising participants
Polish biologists
19th-century Polish botanists
19th-century Polish zoologists
Burials at Powązki Cemetery